Anochrostomus is a genus of seed bugs in the family Lygaeidae. There are at least two described species in Anochrostomus.

Species
These two species belong to the genus Anochrostomus:
 Anochrostomus formosoides Baranowski, 2005
 Anochrostomus formosus (Blanchard, 1840)

References

Further reading

External links

 

Lygaeidae